Roma (minor planet designation: 472 Roma) is an asteroid.  It was discovered by Luigi Carnera on July 11, 1901. Its provisional name was 1901 GP. This asteroid was named by Antonio Abetti for the city of Rome in Italy, the
native country of its discoverer.

At 21:57 UT, on Thursday, July 8, 2010, this 50 km wide asteroid occulted the star Delta Ophiuchi in an event lasting about five seconds. The occultation path crossed central Europe along a band that ran through Stockholm, Copenhagen, Bremen, Nantes and Bilbao.

This is a member of the dynamic Maria family of asteroids that were probably formed as the result of a collisional breakup of a parent body.

References

External links
 
 

Maria asteroids
Roma
Roma
S-type asteroids (Tholen)
19010711